Muricopsis deformis is a species of sea snail, a marine gastropod mollusk in the family Muricidae, the murex snails or rock snails.

Description

Distribution
The type locality for its junior synonym, Risomurex mosquitensis is Puerto Vargas, Cahuita National Park, Mosquito Gulf, Costa Rica.

References

Muricidae
Gastropods described in 1846